Confirmatory blockmodeling is a deductive approach in blockmodeling, where a blockmodel (or part of it) is prespecify before the analysis, and then the analysis is fit to this model. When only a part of analysis is prespecify (like individual cluster(s) or location of the block types), it is called partially confirmatory blockmodeling.<ref name="generalized">{{cite book |last1=Doreian |first1=Patrick |last2=Batagelj |first2=Vladimir |last3=Ferligoj |first3=Anuška |date=2004 | title=Generalized Blockmodeling (Structural Analysis in the Social Sciences) |publisher=Cambridge University Press |isbn=0-521-84085-6}}</ref> 

This is so-called indirect approach, where the blockmodeling is done on the blockmodel fitting (e.g., a priori'' hypothesized blockmodel).

Opposite approach to the confirmatory blockmodeling is an inductive exploratory blockmodeling.

References

See also 
 prespecific blockmodeling

Blockmodeling